Petrolia Consolidated Independent School District is a public school district based in Petrolia, Texas (USA).

In addition to Petrolia, the district also serves the cities of Dean and Byers. In May 2012 voters of Petrolia and the neighboring Byers Independent School District agreed to consolidate with Petrolia surviving after the merger. The merger took effect May 25, 2012.

In 2009, the school district was rated "recognized" by the Texas Education Agency.

The district changed to a four day school week for most, but not all, weeks in fall 2021.

Schools
Petrolia High School (Grades 9-12)
Petrolia Junior High (Grades 7-8)
Petrolia Elementary (Grades PK-6)
2006 National Blue Ribbon School

References

External links
Petrolia CISD

School districts in Clay County, Texas